Angels of Darkness, Demons of Light II is the seventh full-length studio album by the band Earth, released on February 14, 2012, through Southern Lord Records.  This album was recorded at the same time as its predecessor Angels of Darkness, Demons of Light I.

Track listing

Personnel
 Dylan Carlson - electric guitar and devices
 Adrienne Davies – trap kit and percussives
 Lori Goldston – cello and devices
 Karl Blau – electric bass guitar

References

2012 albums
Earth (American band) albums
Sequel albums